Psaliodes fervescens is a species of moth in the family Geometridae first described by Harrison Gray Dyar Jr. in 1920. It is found in Central America.

The MONA or Hodges number for Psaliodes fervescens is 7315.

References

Further reading

 
 
 
 
 
 
 
 
 
 

Hydriomenini
Articles created by Qbugbot
Moths described in 1920